The grammar of the German language is quite similar to that of the other Germanic languages.
Although some features of German grammar, such as the formation of some of the verb forms, resemble those of English, German grammar differs from that of English in that it has, among other things, cases and gender in nouns and a strict verb-second word order in main clauses. 

German has retained many of the grammatical distinctions that some Germanic languages have lost in whole or in part. There are three genders and four cases, and verbs are conjugated for person and number. Accordingly, German has more inflections than English, and uses more suffixes. For example, in comparison to the -s added to third-person singular present-tense verbs in English, most German verbs employ four different suffixes for the conjugation of present-tense verbs, namely - for the first-person singular, - for the informal second-person singular, - for the third-person singular and for the informal second-person plural, and - for the first- and third-person plural, as well as for the formal second-person singular/plural.

Owing to the gender and case distinctions, the articles have more possible forms. In addition, some prepositions combine with some of the articles.

Numerals are similar to other Germanic languages. Unlike modern English, Swedish, Norwegian, Icelandic and Faroese, units are placed before tens as in Early Modern English, Danish, Dutch, Yiddish and Frisian.

Nouns

A German noun – excluding pluralia tantum – has one of three specific grammatical genders (masculine, feminine, neuter). Nouns are declined for case (nominative, accusative, dative, genitive) and grammatical number (singular, plural). In German, all nouns are capitalized, not just proper nouns.

Gender

German has all three genders of late Proto-Indo-European—the masculine, the feminine, and the neuter. Most German nouns are of one of these genders. Thus these are not illogical. However, gender and sex don't have to agree as in:  (old, regional or anthropological: "woman"; a cognate of the English "wife"),  ("human", male or female),  ("guest", male or female; the feminine  is obsolete). Furthermore, in German, the gender of nouns without natural gender is not comprehensively predictable.

Students of German are often advised to learn German nouns with their accompanying definite article, as the definite article of a German noun corresponds to the gender of the noun. However, the meaning or form, especially the ending, of a noun can be used to recognize 80% of noun genders.

Plural

The German language has several different ways of forming the plural. Most feminine nouns are regular, using the ending n or en, but many masculine and neuter nouns are not. Some foreign endings, such as Latin , are deleted before the plural ending (e.g.  → ). Sometimes the stress in the plural form is changed, for example der  → .

Special colloquial or dialectal plural forms also exist.

Case

General
Unlike English, which has lost almost all forms of declension of nouns and adjectives, German inflects nouns, adjectives, articles and pronouns into four grammatical cases. The cases are the nominative, genitive, dative, and accusative. The case of a particular noun depends on the grammatical function of the noun in the sentence. 
 Nominative: The subject of a sentence, that which carries out the action
He loves her.
 Genitive: The possessor of something, or the object of certain prepositions or verbs; in English "Whose?"
This is Susanna's book.
 Dative: The indirect object, as in when an object is given to someone, or the object of certain prepositions and verbs
I gave the book to her.
 Accusative: The direct object, that which is acted upon, or the object of certain prepositions
He loves her.
Note: In earlier usage (17th–19th century) German words derived from Latin also had a vocative, a dative and an ablative case. E.g.: the Latin-German dative: "er aber sagte zu Petro" [Petrus (m.)]; ablative: "von dem Corpore" [Corpus (n.)], "von der Radice" [Radix (f.)], and some words still have a vocative (e.g.

Example:  the table
{| class="wikitable"
|-
|          ||Singular:||Plural:
|-
|:||||
|-
|:||||
|-
|:||||
|-
|:||||
|}

In a jocular sentence (using only one noun for understanding purposes):
 [nominative]  [dative]  [accusative]  [genitive] 
The table [] gave (to) the table [] the table [] of the table [].
The table gave the table's table to the table.

This sentence is an example of how cases are used in German. This differs from English, where the word order in a sentence has more meaning. Because the function of each noun is not marked by its position within the sentence but by the declined articles—and in case of genitive and dative also by a suffix at the end of the noun itself—the German sentence could also be:

etc.

Although some of these may sound exotic in modern-day German, they are grammatically correct (and even rather unusual constructions are more regularly used in poetry).

In contrast to strongly inflected languages like Latin, German expresses cases chiefly by inflecting the determiner that accompanies the noun rather than the noun itself. However, grammatical number (singular vs. plural) is nearly always expressed by inflecting the noun. Other exceptions of a suffix expressing the case of a noun along with the article are the forms of genitive and dative singular and dative plural.

Genitive
Today, the use of the genitive case is relatively rare in spoken language – speakers sometimes substitute the dative case for the genitive in conversation. Television programs and movies often contain a mix of both, dative substitution and regular genitive, depending on how formal or "artistic" the program is intended to be. The use of the dative substitution is more common in southern German dialects, whereas Germans from northern regions (where Luther's Bible-German had to be learned like a foreign language at that time) use the genitive more frequently. Though it has become quite common not to use the genitive case when it would formally be required, many Germans know how to use it and generally do so. Especially among the higher educated, it is considered a minor embarrassment to be caught using the dative case incorrectly. So it is not typically recommended to avoid the genitive when learning German: although the genitive has been gradually falling out of use for about 600 years, it is still far from extinct. The historical development of the  has to some extent re-established the genitive into the language, and not necessarily just in written form. For example, the genitive is rarely used in colloquial German to express a possessive relation (e.g. "my father's car" may sound odd to some Germans in colloquial speech), but the partitive genitive is quite common today (e.g. "one of the best"). Furthermore, some verbs take the genitive case in their object, but this is often ignored by some native speakers; instead, they replace these genitive objects with (substitutional) prepositional constructions: e.g. ("I'm ashamed of you.") turns into  (or ). ("I'm ashamed because of you.").

A German book series called Der Dativ ist dem Genitiv sein Tod ("The dative is to the genitive its death") alludes to this phenomenon (being called "genitive's death struggle" by the author) in its title. In correct standard German, the title would be  ("The dative is the genitive's death"), or alternatively  ("The dative is the death of the genitive"). As is apparent, the book uses dialect, i.e. by employing the dative case together with a possessive pronoun instead of the genitive, to poke fun at what the author perceives as a decline in the German language, since in written German a dative construction replacing the genitive is still considered a major error. This is, by the way, not how most Standard German speakers would colloquially replace the genitive case; rather, this usage is prevalent in some German regional dialects, such as Bavarian. Standard German speakers would construct , which is (being literally the English "of the Genitive") — incorrect in the Standard as well, but far less incriminating.

Linguistically, the thesis of the genitive case dying out can easily be refuted. Indeed, the genitive case has been widely out of use in most dialects of the German language for centuries. Only the replacement of dialects by a colloquial Standard German is new, and the use of the genitive case in the written language is unaffected.

The construction ', virtually appears only in Latin beginners' translations, as the sentence should indicate. Some dialects have  which is literally a dativus possessivus. If a genitive is unmarked and without article (practically, in the plural), usage of ', followed by the dative, is not only legitimate but required, as in:  (minorities' affairs are to be protected). Additionally, the dative case is commonly used to indicate possession of bodily parts that are the direct objects of an action. In English, this construction only occurs in the construction to look someone in the eye and its variants.

Dative
The dative case is used for the indirect object of a verb. The sentence  ("I give my son a dog") contains a subject , a verb , an indirect object ; and a direct object .  is the to whom or the destination of the object of the subject's action, and therefore takes the masculine dative .

Dative also focuses on location. (See accusative or dative prepositions below.) German places strong emphasis on the difference between location and motion; the accusative case is used for motion and the dative for location. There are four important verbs that show this dichotomy: /, /, /, / (motion/location). The sentence  [] , "I hang the picture on(to) the wall."  demonstrates motion. On the other hand, the sentence  []  shows location; now, the picture is located on the wall, so  is dative.

Cases after prepositions
The case of a noun after a preposition is decided by that preposition. No prepositions require the nominative case, but any other case may follow one; for example, the preposition  (for) is followed by the accusative case, the word  (with) is followed by the dative, and the word  (outside of) is followed by the genitive case. Certain prepositions, called "two way prepositions", have objects either in dative or accusative, depending on whether the use implies position (e.g.  = "in the kitchen", dative case) or direction (e.g.  = "into the kitchen", accusative case).

Nominal phrases
(The content of this section is not yet applicable for proper names.)

A German nominal phrase, in general, consists of the following components in the following order:
article, number (cardinal or ordinal), adjective(s), noun, genitive attribute, position(s), relative clause, reflexive pronoun

 
(the third stunning performance of the drama by Schiller this week in Hamburg)

Of course, most noun phrases are not this complicated; adjectives, numbers, genitive attributes, positions, relative clauses and emphasizers are always optional.

A nominal phrase contains at least a cardinal number, an adjective, a pronoun or a noun. It always has an article, except if it is an indefinite plural noun or refers to an uncountable mass.

  (the three of them)
  (the tall man)
  (the man)

If the noun is uncountable, an article is not used; otherwise, the meaning of the sentence changes.

  (I buy cheap beer)
  (I buy a bottle/can/glass/sort ... of cheap beer)
  (I have money)
  (I have the money) or (I have enough money to...)

A nominal phrase can be regarded a single unit. It has a case, a number, and a gender. Case and number depend on the context, whereas the main noun determines the gender.

Genitive attribute
A nominal phrase may have a genitive attribute, for example to express possession.  This attribute may be seen as merely another nominal phrase in the genitive case which may hang off another nominal phrase.

  (The profession of the old man.)
  (The hut of the chief of the tribe)
 (genitive phrase has its own genitive phrase). This is uncommon in modern German.  (The hut of the tribe's chief/tribeschief) is preferred.

A direct translation of  would be "the profession of the old man." It is found in poetry, especially if helpful for metrical and rhyming purposes.

Position
A nominal phrase may contain a "position phrase"; this may be seen as merely another nominal phrase with a preposition (or postposition) or a pronominal adverb (see Adverbial phrases).

  (a cloud in the sky)
  (the Chancellor during the civil war in the Congo)
 (position phrase has its own position phrase)
  (the rain in the jungle in the summer)
 (Several position phrases)
  (that mountain over there)

Extended attribute phrase

German permits lengthy nominal modifiers, for instance:

 (literally: the during-the-civil-war-office-holding prime minister), the Prime Minister holding office during the civil war.

 (literally: The still-at-the-beginning-of-the-course-relatively-small-but-nevertheless-noticeable communication difficulties), the communication difficulties still relatively small at the beginning of the course, but nevertheless noticeable.

These are a feature of written (particularly educated) German. One also might hear them in the context of formal oral communications as well (such as news broadcasts, speeches, etc.).

Relative clause
A nominal phrase will often have a relative clause.

Aside from their highly inflected forms, German relative pronouns are less complicated than English. There are two varieties. Etymologically this is related to English that. As in most Germanic languages, including Old English, both of these inflect according to gender, case and number. They get their gender and number from the noun they modify, but the case from their function in their own clause.

The house in which I live is very old.

On the same basis, it would be possible to substitute the pronoun .

Everything that Jack does is a success.

Jack forgot his book, which surprised nobody.

But when  would follow a preposition (still modifying an entire clause), it needs to be replaced with  + preposition or  + preposition when the preposition begins with a vowel. The same applies to indirect questions.

 (not ) 
He didn't know what to apologise for.

They liked what she wrote, which she was proud of.

She gave him a kiss, which he was happy about.

In German, all relative clauses are marked with a comma.

Articles

The inflected forms depend on the number, the case and the gender of the corresponding noun. Articles have the same plural forms for all three genders.

Cardinal numbers
In relation to nouns, cardinal numbers are placed before adjectives, if any. If the number is relatively low, it is usually not combined with an indefinite plural article (e.g.  or ). Personal pronouns of the first and second person are placed before numbers. Personal pronouns of the third person cannot be used with numbers.

 ("three dogs")
 ("the four horsemen of the Apocalypse")
 ("a couple of thousand euros")
 ("we four")

NOT:  BUT:  ("ten horses")
EXCEPTION: NOT  BUT  ("13% of those asked") — because (as in English) "percent" is a borrowing of a Latin phrase, not a noun.

The cardinal number  (one) is partly identical in form and inflection to the indefinite article. The number is distinguished from the article in speech by intonation and in writing sometimes by emphasis (e.g. italics, increased letter-spacing or small caps: ,  or ). The cardinal number (= one), however, always retains its full pronunciation (again like Dutch ).

 may mean
"a red book" – ; or
"one red book" – 

Where an adjective would have weak endings, numbers do not have endings. If an adjective had strong endings, these numbers may also have strong endings in the genitive case.
 ("the house of two young women")

If there is no other word carrying the strong ending of the genitive plural, the numbers must carry it.
 ("the voyage of three sisters")

If these numbers are center of a nominal phrase in the dative plural and no other word carries case markers, they may carry dative endings.
 ("I have given bananas to two (of them)")

Adjectives

German adjectives normally precede the noun they are modifying. German adjectives have endings which depend on the case, number and (in the singular) gender of the nominal phrase. There are three sets of endings: strong endings, mixed endings and weak endings. Which set is used depends on what kind of word the adjective comes after, and sometimes also on the gender and case.

Like articles, adjectives use the same plural endings for all three genders.

 (a loud noise)
 (the loud noise)
 (the big, beautiful moon)

Participles may be used as adjectives and are treated in the same way.

In contrast to Romance languages, adjectives are only declined in the attributive position (that is, when used in nominal phrases to describe a noun directly). Predicative adjectives, separated from the noun by "to be", for example, are not declined and are indistinguishable from adverbs.

NOT:  BUT  ((the) music is loud) or, rarely,  ((the) music is a loud one)

There are three degrees of comparison: positive form, comparative form and superlative form.

Declension of adjectives

The declension of an adjective depends not only on the gender, number and case of the noun it modifies, but also on whether the indefinite article, definite article or no article is used with it. The following table shows two examples which exemplify all three cases:

Note that the word  is declined similarly to the indefinite article.

Declension of adjectives is mandatory even in proper names. The name of Kunsthistorisches Museum in Vienna, for instance, changes into  when preceded by a definite article.  Adjectival bynames given to historical or legendary persons must also be declined according to their grammatical role in a phrase or sentence.  Hence, one says  ("Charlemagne became emperor in the year 800"), but  ("The sword of Charlemagne").

Pronouns

The pronouns of the third person may be used to replace nominal phrases. These have the same gender, number and case as the original nominal phrase. This goes for other pronouns, too.

pronoun [position(s)] [relative clause]

Personal pronouns

Notes:
  can also be written , especially in letters.

The reflexive personal pronoun (in English, "myself" etc.) takes distinct forms only in the 3rd person (and 2nd person formal address) dative and accusative, to wit, . (Uncapitalized also in the 2nd person formal).

Adverbial phrases

Verbs

German verbs may be classified as either weak, if they form their past tense with a dental consonant inflection, or strong, if they exhibit ablaut (vowel gradation).  Most verbs of both types are regular, though various subgroups and anomalies do arise.  However, textbooks often class all strong verbs as irregular.  There are more than 200 strong and irregular verbs, and there is a gradual tendency for strong verbs to become weak.

Verbs in sentence structure

In German declarative main clauses the finite verb is always placed as the second element. When there are more verbs in a sentence, the non-finite ones are placed at the end of the clause. With a subordinating conjunction, all verbs appear at the end of the clause. A verb placed as the second element does not necessarily mean it is the second word, rather, it is the second constituent of the clause. For instance the first position may be occupied by an article and a noun, a possessive pronoun, or even an entire subordinate clause.

Examples: (Underlined word indicates verb as second element.)
 (I play football on Saturday.)
 (My cat is black and white.)

Examples: (Underlined words indicate verbs as both second and last elements.)
 (I will fly to Germany tomorrow.)
 (She would-like to buy a better computer.)

The following examples illustrate the use of subordinate clauses as the first element in a verb second structure: (Bold words indicate a subordinate clause. Underlined words indicate verbs as both second and last elements in the sentence.)
 (Because you like pasta so much, I wanted to invite you to an Italian restaurant this evening.)
 (As soon as I have arrived, I will call you)

Inside a subordinate clause, introduced by a conjunction or a relative pronoun, the finite verb form comes last. Examples: (Bold words indicate the subordinate clause, bold italicized words indicate subordinating conjunction, bold underlined words indicate verbs at end of the sentence)
  (Your sweater is from red material, because it is a Liverpool sweater.)
   (I think that he should eat.)

Separable verbs

German has many verbs that have a separable prefix that can be unattached to its root.
        Peter looks handsome in his suit.
         Lori, do you know my wife?  No?  Then let's ( for once I [will]) introduce you to one another.

Prepositions
Prepositions are designed to give some direction, location, intensity, etc. to a sentence. The way such is indicated in German may be different from the way it would be in English.

Furthermore, there are instances where German uses a preposition in a way that is unlike English, e.g. as a separable prefix attributed to a verb. There is also the verb , literally "to sleep out", which in English idiom would be expressed by "sleep in".

The objects of some prepositions have a fixed case. For example, if , a dative preposition, is used in a sentence, its object will be dative, as in the sentence  (I'm visiting with my family).

The following chart shows the cases associated with several prepositions in common usage.

* With the dative in colloquial style and most often with pronouns.
** May take the ("hypercorrect") genitive.
*** As a preposition takes the genitive or a colloquial dative:  "along the way", but as a postposition it takes the accusative with the same meaning: .

"Unusual" prepositions, which exist in vast amounts in bureaucratic style, as a rule take the genitive.

Two-way prepositions with either the dative or accusative mean location with the dative, as in "where?", and direction with the accusative, as in "where to?".

There are also articled prepositions, that are formed by a simple preposition and an article:

""

 +  becomes 

 +  becomes 

""

 +  becomes 

 +  becomes 

""

 +  becomes 

""

 +  becomes 

 +  becomes 

""

 +  becomes 

""

 +  becomes 

""

 +  becomes 

""

 +  becomes 

""

 +  becomes 

Modal particles

Modal particles ( or ) are a part of speech used frequently in spoken German. These words affect the tone of a sentence instead of conveying a specific literal meaning. Many of these words also have a more basic, specific meaning (e.g. "well",  "yes",  "already",  "also"), but in their modal use, this meaning is not directly expressed — that is, there is no real English equivalent to those words, so in an English translation, the German modal particles are usually omitted.

Sentences

German sentence structure is similar to other Germanic languages in its use of V2 word order.

See also
 Standard German phonology

Notes

References

Bibliography
 
 
 Wietusch, Gudrun (2006). Grundkurs Grammatik. Cornelsen. 
 Pahlow, Heike (2010). Deutsche Grammatik - einfach, kompakt und übersichtlich''. Engelsdorfer Verlag, Leipzig.

External links

 Deutsch-ueben tk blog – German Grammar exercises for all levels with explanations in German.
 German Grammar – Toms Deutschseite – German grammar explained by a native speaker (in English)
 German Grammar Lessons – German grammar lessons along with exercises
 Lingolia German Grammar – German Grammar explanations with exercises
  German grammar overview German grammar (in English) (+ multiple choice test) explained by a native speaker.